Interracial topics include:

 Interracial marriage, marriage between two people of different races
 Interracial marriage in the United States
 2009 Louisiana interracial marriage incident
 Interracial adoption, placing a child of one racial group or ethnic group with adoptive parents of another racial or ethnic group
 Interracial personals, advertisements
 Interracial pornography, a form of visual pornography depicting sexual activity between performers of different racial groups
 Miscegenation, the mixing of different racial groups
 Anti-miscegenation laws in the United States
 Commission on Interracial Cooperation, an organization in the southern United States in the early 20th century
 Multiracial, people with an identifiable heritage from more than a single racial group
 First interracial kiss on television

See also

 Exogamy
 Transracial (disambiguation)

Race and society
Lists of topics